KTMO is a radio station airing a country music format licensed to New Madrid, Missouri, broadcasting on 106.5 MHz FM.  The station is owned by Pollack Broadcasting Co.

References

External links

KTMO New Madrid Legal ID

Country radio stations in the United States
TMO